Cupcini is a village in Edineț District, Moldova. Two villages are administered by the town, Chetroșica Veche and Chiurt.

History 
Between 1958 and 1990 it was called Kalininsk.

Notable people 
 Alexandru Oleinic
Nikita Vinitski
Alexander Kovalchuk

Gallery

References

Cities and towns in Moldova
Edineț District